The Waigeo rainbowfish (Melanotaenia catherinae) is a species of rainbowfish in the subfamily Melanotaeniinae. It is endemic to West Papua in Indonesia. It reaches a maximum length of around 7.5 cm. This species was described as Rhombatractus catherinae in 1910 by Lieven Ferdinand de Beaufort|de Beaufort from a type locality which was given as a rivulet flowing into the Rabial River in Waigeo. de Beaufort gave this species the specific name catherinae to honour his wife, Catherine, who had assisted him on the expedition on which the type was collected.

References

Allen, G.R. (1991). Field guide to the freshwater fishes of New Guinea. Christensen Research Institute, Madang, Papua New Guinea.
Allen, G. R. and P. J. Unmack (2008). A new species of rainbowfish (Melanotaeniidae: Melanotaenia), from Batanta Island, western New Guinea. Aqua, International Journal of Ichthyology 13 (3-4): 109–120.
de Beaufort, L. F. (1910). Weitere Bestätigung einer zoogeographischen Prophezeiung. Zoologischer Anzeiger. 36 (12/13): 249–252.
 Waigeo rainbowfish on Home of the Rainbowfish 

Waigeo rainbowfish
Freshwater fish of Western New Guinea
Taxonomy articles created by Polbot
Fish described in 1910